Major-General Anthony St Leger (1731/32 – 19 April 1786) was a successful soldier, a Member of Parliament for Grimsby, and the founder of the St. Leger Stakes horse race.

Family
Born in February 1731 at Grangemellon, Kildare, Ireland, he was the fourth son of Sir John St Leger, who was a judge of the Court of Exchequer, and his second wife Lavinia, daughter of Kingsmill Pennefather of Cashel. He was educated at Eton College. He attended Peterhouse, before embarking on a career in the army. His brother Barry St. Leger was also a distinguished army officer. They belonged to the junior branch of a long-established landowning family from Cork: the head of the senior branch was Viscount Doneraile.

Marriage
In 1761, St Leger married a Yorkshire woman, Margaret Wombwell. That same year he was appointed lieutenant-colonel of the 124th Regiment of Foot, but a year later the regiment disbanded, and St Leger took on the Park Hill estate in Firbeck, where he later bred and raced horses.

Career
From 1768 to 1774, St Leger sat as MP for Grimsby. Two years after leaving the Commons, and with the assistance of Charles Watson-Wentworth, he established a two-mile race for three-year-old horses, on the Cantley Common in Doncaster. This was to become the St. Leger Stakes.

In 1779, St Leger re-entered the army as colonel of the 86th Regiment of Foot. He subsequently achieved the rank of brigadier general, before serving a period as the Governor of Saint Lucia (1781-1783). His last posting was in Ireland, by which time he was a major general.

Death and legacy
St Leger died on 19 April 1786. He was buried in Saint Anne's Church, Dublin.

In addition to giving his name to the St Leger Stakes, the St Leger Arms public house in Laughton en le Morthen (two miles up the road from the Park Hill estate) is also named after Anthony St Leger.

References

1731 births
1786 deaths
18th-century Irish people
People from County Kildare
Alumni of Peterhouse, Cambridge
British Army generals
Members of the Parliament of Great Britain for Great Grimsby
People educated at Eton College
86th (Royal County Down) Regiment of Foot officers
British MPs 1768–1774
Anthony
Governors of British Saint Lucia